Sergey Vsevolodovich Belavenets (18 July 19106 March 1942) was a Soviet chess master, theoretician, and chess journalist.

Early life 

Belavenets was born in Smolensk to a noble family with a long history of serving in the Russian navy. He and Mikhail Yudovich, known as the Smolensk twins, had been close friends since meeting in a school match in 1925. Over the next few years they studied with Belavenets's uncle, Konstantin Vygodchikov.

Chess career 

He took 4th in the 2nd Belarusian Championship in 1925 (Solomon Rozental won), tied for 5-9th in the 11th Championship of Moscow in 1930, tied for 1st-3rd in the 13th Championship of Moscow in 1932, took 4th in the 14th Championship of Moscow in 1933/34, won at Moscow 1934 (the 4th Russian Championship), took 3rd in the 15th Championship of Moscow in 1935, tied for 3rd-5th in the 16th Championship of Moscow in 1936, shared 1st in the 17th Championship of Moscow 1937. He tied for 1st-2nd with Vasily Smyslov in the 18th Championship of Moscow in 1938, tied for 6-7th in the 19th Championship of Moscow in 1939/40, and took 2nd in the 20th Championship of Moscow in 1941.

Death 

While fighting in the Soviet Army during the Second World War, Belavenets was killed in an action at Staraya Russa in 1942.

Since 1984, international chess competitions "In Memoriam of S.V.Belavenets" have been held in Smolensk.

His daughter Liudmila held the title of women's world correspondence chess champion from 1984 to 1992.

References

1910 births
1942 deaths
Sportspeople from Smolensk
Soviet chess players
Soviet chess writers
Soviet male writers
20th-century male writers
Soviet military personnel killed in World War II
20th-century chess players